Scotland national cerebral palsy football team is the national cerebral football team for Scotland that represents the team in international competitions. At the 2015 IPCPF World Championships, Scotland finished 9th after defeating Canada in overtime.

Background 
Scottish Disability Sport (SDS) manages the national team. While Scotland was active in participating on the World Championship level by 2016, the country did not have a national championships to support national team player development.

Ranking 

Scotland was ranked ninth in the world by the IFCPF in 2016. In November 2014, they were ranked seventh. In August 2013, the team was eighth. Scotland was ranked sixth in September 2012. The team was ranked seventh in July 2011.

Players 
There have been a number of players for the Scottish squad.

Results 

Scotland has participated in a number of international tournaments. The team was scheduled to participate in the 2016 IFCPF Qualification Tournament World Championships in Vejen, Denmark in early August.  The tournament was part of the qualifying process for the 2017 IFCPF World Championships.  Other teams scheduled to participate included  Canada, Portugal, Iran, Northern Ireland, Australia, Venezuela, Japan, Republic of South Korea, Germany, Denmark, and Spain.

IFCPF World Championships 
Scotland has participated in the IFCPF World Championships.  At the 2011 CP-ISRA World Championship in Drenthe, Scotland defeated Canada 4 - 1.

References 

Cerebral Palsy
Great Britain at the Paralympics
National cerebral palsy football teams